High School for Public Service: Heroes of Tomorrow is a New York City public high school in Brooklyn, New York, founded in 2003. In addition to its academic curriculum, HSPS encourages its students to become involved in their communities through public service learning. HSPS was awarded an 'A' by the New York City Department of Education for the 2009–2010 school year.

Awards
 The High School for Public Service was named a 2010 National Title 1 Distinguished School for New York State.
 HSPS was ranked as a bronze medal by U.S. News & World Report
 NY Daily News Feature Articles on the HSPS Farm
 GrowNYC Blog, "29 Mini-Grants Awarded to NYC School Gardens!"
 New York Times, "Concrete Farm Grows Chard (Callaloo, Too)"

References

External links
 High School for Public Service: Heroes of Tomorrow Official Website
 
 

2003 establishments in New York City
Crown Heights, Brooklyn
Educational institutions established in 2003
Public high schools in Brooklyn